Henri Dobert (January 31, 1915 – December 9, 1943) was a member of the Buckmaster resistant cell during World War II. He was in charge of gathering information on building, location and troop movement in the Cabourg-Houlgate sector in Normandy. He was hired for the construction of the Atlantic Wall by the Organisation Todt and was able to gather information.

Execution 
He was arrested by the Gestapo and shot soon later in 9 December 1943 near Rouen.

References

French Resistance members
Houlgate
1915 births
1943 deaths
Resistance members killed by Nazi Germany
People executed by Germany by firearm
French people executed by Nazi Germany
Deaths by firearm in France